is a Japanese professional baseball outfielder for the Yomiuri Giants in Japan's Nippon Professional Baseball.

On November 16, 2018, he was selected Yomiuri Giants roster at the 2018 MLB Japan All-Star Series exhibition game against MLB All-Stars.

References

External links

NPB.com

1993 births
Living people
People from Sakura, Chiba
Japanese baseball players
Nippon Professional Baseball outfielders
Baseball people from Chiba Prefecture
Waseda University alumni
Yomiuri Giants players